Haycocks is an English surname. Notable people with this surname include:

 Jaymie Haycocks (born 1983), English squash player
 Paddy Haycocks (born 1950), British broadcaster

See also
 Haycock (surname)

English-language surnames